In geometry, a zonohedron is a convex polyhedron that is centrally symmetric, every face of which is a polygon that is centrally symmetric (a zonogon). Any zonohedron may equivalently be described as the Minkowski sum of a set of line segments in three-dimensional space, or as the three-dimensional projection of a hypercube. Zonohedra were originally defined and studied by E. S. Fedorov, a Russian crystallographer. More generally, in any dimension, the Minkowski sum of line segments forms a polytope known as a zonotope.

Zonohedra that tile space 

The original motivation for studying zonohedra is that the Voronoi diagram of any lattice forms a convex uniform honeycomb in which the cells are zonohedra. Any zonohedron formed in this way can tessellate 3-dimensional space and is called a primary parallelohedron. Each primary parallelohedron is combinatorially equivalent to one of five types: the rhombohedron (including the cube), hexagonal prism, truncated octahedron, rhombic dodecahedron, and the rhombo-hexagonal dodecahedron.

Zonohedra from Minkowski sums 

Let  be a collection of three-dimensional vectors. With each vector  we may associate a line segment . The Minkowski sum  forms a zonohedron, and all zonohedra that contain the origin have this form. The vectors from which the zonohedron is formed are called its generators. This characterization allows the definition of zonohedra to be generalized to higher dimensions, giving zonotopes.

Each edge in a zonohedron is parallel to at least one of the generators, and has length equal to the sum of the lengths of the generators to which it is parallel. Therefore, by choosing a set of generators with no parallel pairs of vectors, and by setting all vector lengths equal, we may form an equilateral version of any combinatorial type of zonohedron.

By choosing sets of vectors with high degrees of symmetry, we can form in this way, zonohedra with at least as much symmetry. For instance, generators equally spaced around the equator of a sphere, together with another pair of generators through the poles of the sphere, form zonohedra in the form of prism over regular -gons: the cube, hexagonal prism, octagonal prism, decagonal prism, dodecagonal prism, etc.
Generators parallel to the edges of an octahedron form a truncated octahedron, and generators parallel to the long diagonals of a cube form a rhombic dodecahedron.

The Minkowski sum of any two zonohedra is another zonohedron, generated by the union of the generators of the two given zonohedra. Thus, the Minkowski sum of a cube and a truncated octahedron forms the truncated cuboctahedron, while the Minkowski sum of the cube and the rhombic dodecahedron forms the truncated rhombic dodecahedron. Both of these zonohedra are simple (three faces meet at each vertex), as is the truncated small rhombicuboctahedron formed from the Minkowski sum of the cube, truncated octahedron, and rhombic dodecahedron.

Zonohedra from arrangements 

The Gauss map of any convex polyhedron maps each face of the polygon to a point on the unit sphere, and maps each edge of the polygon separating a pair of faces to a great circle arc connecting the corresponding two points. In the case of a zonohedron, the edges surrounding each face can be grouped into pairs of parallel edges, and when translated via the Gauss map any such pair becomes a pair of contiguous segments on the same great circle. Thus, the edges of the zonohedron can be grouped into zones of parallel edges, which correspond to the segments of a common great circle on the Gauss map, and the 1-skeleton of the zonohedron can be viewed as the planar dual graph to an arrangement of great circles on the sphere. Conversely any arrangement of great circles may be formed from the Gauss map of a zonohedron generated by vectors perpendicular to the planes through the circles.

Any simple zonohedron corresponds in this way to a simplicial arrangement, one in which each face is a triangle.  Simplicial arrangements of great circles correspond via central projection to simplicial arrangements of lines in the projective plane. There are three known infinite families of simplicial arrangements, one of which leads to the prisms when converted to zonohedra, and the other two of which correspond to additional infinite families of simple zonohedra. There are also many sporadic examples that do not fit into these three families.

It follows from the correspondence between zonohedra and arrangements, and from the Sylvester–Gallai theorem which (in its projective dual form) proves the existence of crossings of only two lines in any arrangement, that every zonohedron has at least one pair of opposite parallelogram faces. (Squares, rectangles, and rhombuses count for this purpose as special cases of parallelograms.) More strongly, every zonohedron has at least six parallelogram faces, and every zonohedron has a number of parallelogram faces that is linear in its number of generators.

Types of zonohedra 
Any prism over a regular polygon with an even number of sides forms a zonohedron. These prisms can be formed so that all faces are regular: two opposite faces are equal to the regular polygon from which the prism was formed, and these are connected by a sequence of square faces. Zonohedra of this type are the cube, hexagonal prism, octagonal prism, decagonal prism, dodecagonal prism, etc.

In addition to this infinite family of regular-faced zonohedra, there are three Archimedean solids, all omnitruncations of the regular forms: 
 The truncated octahedron, with 6 square and 8 hexagonal faces. (Omnitruncated tetrahedron)
 The truncated cuboctahedron, with 12 squares, 8 hexagons, and 6 octagons. (Omnitruncated cube)
 The truncated icosidodecahedron, with 30 squares, 20 hexagons and 12 decagons. (Omnitruncated dodecahedron)

In addition, certain Catalan solids (duals of Archimedean solids) are again zonohedra:
 Kepler's rhombic dodecahedron is the dual of the cuboctahedron.
 The rhombic triacontahedron is the dual of the icosidodecahedron.

Others with congruent rhombic faces:
 Bilinski's rhombic dodecahedron.
 Rhombic icosahedron
 Rhombohedron

There are infinitely many zonohedra with rhombic faces that are not all congruent to each other. They include:
 Rhombic enneacontahedron

Dissection of zonohedra 

Although it is not generally true that any polyhedron has a dissection into any other polyhedron of the same volume (see Hilbert's third problem), it is known that any two zonohedra of equal volumes can be dissected into each other.

Zonohedrification 

Zonohedrification is a process defined by George W. Hart for creating a zonohedron from another polyhedron.

First the vertices of any seed polyhedron are considered vectors from the polyhedron center. These vectors create the zonohedron which we call the zonohedrification of the original polyhedron. If the seed polyhedron has central symmetry, opposite points define the same direction, so the number of zones in the zonohedron is half the number of vertices of the seed. For any two vertices of the original polyhedron, there are two opposite planes of the zonohedrification which each have two edges parallel to the vertex vectors.

Zonotopes
The Minkowski sum of line segments in any dimension forms a type of polytope called a zonotope. Note that in the special case where , the zonotope  is a (possibly degenerate) parallelotope.

The facets of any zonotope are themselves zonotopes of one lower dimension; for instance, the faces of zonohedra are zonogons. Examples of four-dimensional zonotopes include the tesseract (Minkowski sums of d mutually perpendicular equal length line segments), the omnitruncated 5-cell, and the truncated 24-cell. Every permutohedron is a zonotope.

Zonotopes and Matroids

Tilings
Tiling properties of the zonotope  are also closely related to the oriented matroid  associated to it. First we consider the space-tiling property. Such a zonotope is called a space-tiling zonotope. The following classification of space-tiling zonotopes is due to McMullen: The zonotope  generated by the vectors  tiles space if and only if the corresponding oriented matroid is regular. So the seemingly geometric condition of being a space-tiling zonotope actually depends only on the combinatorial structure of the generating vectors.

Many of the images of zonohedra on this page can be viewed as zonotopal tilings of a 2-dimensional zonotope by simply considering them as planar objects (as opposed to planar representations of three dimensional objects).

Volume 
Zonohedra, and n-dimensional zonotopes in general, are noteworthy for admitting a simple analytic formula for their volume.

Let  be the zonotope  generated by a set of vectors .

The determinant in this formula makes sense because (as noted above) when the set  has cardinality equal to the dimension  of the ambient space, the zonotope is a parallelotope.

Note that when , this formula simply states that the zonotope has n-volume zero.

References 

   Reprinted in 
 
 Rolf Schneider, Chapter 3.5 "Zonoids and other classes of convex bodies" in Convex bodies: the Brunn-Minkowski theory, Cambridge University Press, Cambridge, 1993.

External links 
 
 
 
 
 
 

Polyhedra
 
Oriented matroids

de:Zonotop#Zonoeder